Raised on Whipped Cream is the debut studio album by American punk rock band Killradio, released on September 7, 2004 by Columbia Records. It featured the single "Do You Know (Knife in Your Back)". The music revolves around a broad range of social commentary (i.e., from criticism of the Iraq war to modern radio programming).

Track listing
All songs written by Killradio
"A.M.E.R.I.K.A."
"Scavenger"
"Do You Know (Knife in Your Back)"
"Pull Out"
"Entertained"
"Penis Envy"
"Freedom?"
"Where Go We"
"Burning the Water Brown"
"Ad Jam"
"Classroom Blues"
"Raised On Whipped Cream"
"Feeding the Rich (Bonus Track)"

Credits and personnel
Brandon Jordan - Vocals, guitar
Jasten King - Guitar, backing vocals
Dirty - Bass
Duke - Drums, backing vocals

References

Killradio albums
2004 debut albums
Columbia Records albums